Hu Bingqing (born 25 January 1992) is a Chinese actress who graduated from the Shanghai Institute of Visual Art. She is recognized for her role as Qi Baicao in The Whirlwind Girl (2015), Gao Yue in The Legend of Qin (2015) and Dugu Qieluo in The Legend of Dugu (2018).

Career
Hu debuted with a minor role in the 2013 television series The Golden Flower and Her Son-in-law. She played her first leading role after successfully auditioning for it in the web drama Coco Soul produced by Tencent Video.

In 2014, Hu was cast as a supporting role in the historical drama The Imperial Doctress produced by Tangren Media. She subsequently signed a contract with the company.

In 2015, Hu starred as the female lead in the youth sports drama The Whirlwind Girl. The drama was a commercial success and launched Hu to fame. The same year, she starred in the historical wuxia drama  The Legend of Qin playing dual roles.

In 2017, Hu starred in a segment of the slice-of-life drama Midnight Diner, playing a pair of lovers with Jam Hsiao.

In 2018, Hu starred in the fantasy historical drama Beauties in the Closet playing a weasel spirit. The same year, she starred in the historical fiction drama The Legend of Dugu, playing the role of Dugu Qieluo. The television series was well-received by viewers and had a significant following online.

In 2020, Hu starred in the period action drama  Forward Forever. The same year, she is set to star in the campus romance drama Unrequited Love alongside Hu Yitian.

Filmography

Television series

Short film

Discography

2021   Món quà của giáng sinh   Thầm yêu - Quất sinh Hoài Nam 2021

Awards

References

Living people
1992 births
Chinese television actresses
21st-century Chinese actresses
Actresses from Anhui
Tangren Media